Ramesh Jaiswal is an Indian politician and a member of 18th Legislative Assembly of Uttar Pradesh representing Mughalsarai. He is a member of the Bharatiya Janata Party.

Personal life
Ramesh Jaiswal was born to  Mithai Lal Jaiswal and hails from Mughalsarai city of Chandauli district in Uttar Pradesh. He is a graduate and received his LLB degree from Harish Chandra Postgraduate College, Varanasi in 1995. Jaiswal is a businessperson by profession.

Political career
In the 2022 Uttar Pradesh Legislative Assembly election, Jaiswal represented Bharatiya Janata Party as a candidate from Mughalsarai and went on to defeat Samajwadi Party's Chandra Shekhar Yadav by a margin of 14,921 votes, succeeding own party member Sadhana Singh in the process.

References

1970s births
Living people
Bharatiya Janata Party politicians from Uttar Pradesh
Uttar Pradesh MLAs 2022–2027
People from Chandauli district
Year of birth missing (living people)